Tasiilaq, formerly Ammassalik and Angmagssalik, is a town in the Sermersooq municipality in southeastern Greenland. With 1,985 inhabitants as of 2020, it is the most populous community on the eastern coast, and the seventh-largest town in Greenland. The Sermilik Station, dedicated to the research of the nearby Mittivakkat Glacier, is located near the town.

History

Prehistory to the fifteenth century
The people of Saqqaq culture were the first to reach eastern Greenland, arriving from the north, through what is now known as Peary Land and Independence Fjord, to be surpassed by the Dorset culture. The Norse would have been familiar with the area as the first landmark on the voyage between Iceland's Snæfellsnes peninsula and Greenland. Thule migrations passed through the area in the fifteenth century, finding the southeastern coast uninhabited.

Eighteenth and nineteenth centuries
Due to back migrations to the more densely populated western coast, the southeastern coast was deserted for another two hundred years – the region wasn't settled until late eighteenth century, with the village surviving as the only permanent settlement in the nineteenth century. Population increased however from the 1880s, dispersing over several villages in the area.

The permanent settlement was founded in 1894 as a Danish trading station. The town was previously known as Ammassalik (old spelling: Angmagssalik). The official name change took place in 1997.

Twenty-first century

Alcohol consumption was banned by Greenland's self rule authority in Tasiilaq on September 7, 2021, over a two-week period until September 17 following a surge of violence & suicide in the town. Following this prohibition, reports of domestic violence had greatly decreased. Social workers from the town said that "it is only a short term solution, but necessary to put the breaks on alcohol-fueled incidents."

Geography 

The fjord is an inlet of the long Ammassalik Fjord emptying into the North Atlantic to the east of the town. The large Sermilik Fjord lies further to the west.

Population 
With 1,985 inhabitants as of 2020, Tasiilaq is one of the fastest-growing towns in Greenland. The migrants are continuing the trend for population growth. Together with Nuuk, it is the only town in the Sermersooq municipality exhibiting stable growth patterns over the last two decades. The population increased by over 37% relative to the 1990 levels, and by over 18% relative to the 2000 levels.

Language 
Tasiilaq is the main location where East Greenlandic is spoken.

Transport 

There are no roads far outside Tasiilaq. The longest is a  narrow gravel road to the hydro power plant. Transport to further places is by helicopter or boat.

Air 

Air Greenland operates helicopter services from Tasiilaq Heliport to neighboring Kulusuk Airport ( away), which offers connections to Nuuk, and to Iceland. The heliport serves as a local helicopter hub with flights to several villages in the region: Isortoq, Kuummiit, Sermiligaaq, and Tiniteqilaaq.

Sea 
In the summer, the cargo boats of Royal Arctic Line connect Tasiilaq with Kulusuk, providing an ad hoc alternative for the helicopter flights of Air Greenland.

Tourism

In summer main activities involve: ice cave tours, ice climbing, glacier hikes, boat trips, whale watching and kayaking.

Climate
Tasiilaq has a tundra climate (ET), with long, cold and snowy winters and short, cool drier summers.  From time to time, Tasiilaq is affected by piteraqs. On 6 February 1970 the worst piteraq ever documented hit Tasiilaq, causing heavy damage and nearly ruining the town.

Twin towns – sister cities
Tasiilaq is twinned with:

 Kópavogur, Iceland

References

Populated places in Greenland
Populated places established in 1894
Sermersooq
1894 establishments in North America
19th-century establishments in Greenland
Road-inaccessible communities of North America